Robby Bostain (Hebrew: רובי בוסטיין; born March 16, 1984) is an American-Israeli former professional basketball player.

Career
Bostain started his professional career with Landstede Basketbal, a team in the Netherlands that plays in the Dutch Basketball League (DBL). On February 21, 2009, he scored a career-high 49 points in a 105–101 overtime win over Aris Leeuwarden.

After two seasons with the team, he went to Groningen to play for the GasTerra Flames. In his first year with the club, he won the Dutch championship. In his second year, he played in the Euroleague qualification and won the Dutch NBB Cup with the Flames.

In 2012, Bostain signed with Maccabi Ashdod, where he played 11 games. After the season it was announced that Bostain wouldn't return to Israel. On November 12, 2013 Bostain signed with Ironi Nes Ziona. He extended his contract with one year in May 2014.

Honours
Club
Dutch Champion (2010)
Dutch Cup (2011)
Individual
DBL All-Star (3): (2009, 2010, 2011)

References

1984 births
Living people
American expatriate basketball people in the Netherlands
American expatriate basketball people in Israel
Basketball players from Georgia (U.S. state)
Donar (basketball club) players
Dutch Basketball League players
Furman Paladins men's basketball players
Ironi Nes Ziona B.C. players
Landstede Hammers players
Maccabi Ashdod B.C. players
People from Duluth, Georgia
People from Snellville, Georgia
Point guards
American men's basketball players
Sportspeople from the Atlanta metropolitan area